Peter Fang Jianping (born November 1962) is a Chinese Roman Catholic Bishop of Roman Catholic Diocese of Hebei, China. He is also vice-president of the Bishops Conference of the Catholic Church in China (BCCCC).

He was a member of the 10th National Committee of the Chinese People's Political Consultative Conference and a delegate to the 11th and 12th National People's Congress.

Biography
Fang was born in November 1962 in Guye District of Tangshan, Hebei, to a Catholic family. His ancestral home is located in Lulong County. In 1984 he entered the Hebei Provincial Catholic Theological College, where he graduated in 1988. 

On August 6, 1989, Fang became the Roman Catholic Bishop of Huanghuagang, Fengrun District and was ordained bishop by Bishop of the Catholic Diocese of Tangshan John Liu Jinghe. On September 28, 1999, he was elected coadjutor bishop of Tangshan. In November 2010 he was elevated to the Bishop position, replacing John Liu Jinghe.

On July 9, 2004, he was elected vice-president of Chinese Patriotic Catholic Association. On December 9, 2010, he was elected vice-president of the Bishops Conference of the Catholic Church in China (BCCCC).

References

1962 births
Living people
21st-century Roman Catholic bishops in China
People from Tangshan